There are two abolished electorates by the name of Williams in Australia:

 Electoral district of Williams (New South Wales)
 Electoral district of Williams (Western Australia)